Denny is a town in the Falkirk council area of Scotland. At the 2011 census, Denny had a resident population of 8,300.

History
Denny is separated from neighbouring village Dunipace by the River Carron. A stone bridge was built over the river in 1825. Denny Town House was completed in 1931. Until the early 1980s, Denny was a centre for heavy industry, including several iron foundries, brickworks, a coal mine and paper mills. 

The first phase of a £7.6 million regeneration scheme in the town centre was completed in 2017.

Notable people
In the First World War 902 men signed up from Denny and Dunipace. Of those 154 were killed in action or died on service. Decorations were earned by 31 men.

 Thomas Bain, politician
 John Adam Cramb, historian
 David Forrester, divine
 George William Gray, chemist
 Matthew Hay, doctor
 Carl Kirkwood, politician
 Christian Maclagan, archaeologist
 Stevie McCrorie, musician
 William Morehead, landowner
 Simon Perry, Philanthropist

Sport
The local football team are Dunipace F.C., who play at Westfield Park where they moved to from their previous home of Carronbank. They compete in the East of Scotland Football League. Another team, Denny Hibs, operated in the Junior leagues from the 1900s to the 1930s – Dunipace were also part of that setup until the 2010s.

Notable sportspeople from Denny include:
 Sammy Baird, football player and manager
Cameron Buchan, rower
 Martyn Corrigan, football player and manager
 Kenny Deuchar, footballer 
Willie Loney, footballer 
 Niall Mackenzie, motorcycle racer
 Danny Malloy, boxer
 Jimmy McMullan, professional footballer
 Jim McNab, footballer
 Thomas Scott, footballer
 Billy Steel, footballer

References

Citations

Sources

External links

 Denny, Bonnybridge & Banknock at Falkirk Online 

 
Towns in Falkirk (council area)
Stirlingshire